Edward Rosenstein (August 5, 1864November 26, 1931) was a Jewish-American shoe salesman, saloonkeeper and politician from New York.

Life 
Rosenstein was born on August 5, 1864, on the ocean liner that brought his parents to America, near the end of its journey. He and his family was settled in the Lower East Side in New York City, where his father worked as a cobbler.

Rosenstein initially worked as a shoe manufacturer with his father. He then worked as a salesman with L. M. Hirsch for eight years, followed by the Surprise Shoe Bazaar for another eight years. He then worked at the Siegel-Cooper Company. In 1898, he was appointed county detective in the New York County District Attorney's office. He resigned in 1902 and returned to the Siegel-Cooper Company.

In 1902, Rosenstein was elected to the New York State Assembly as a Democrat, representing the New York County 12th District. He served in the assembly in 1903, 1904, and 1905.

Before he was elected to the Assembly, Rosenstein opened a saloon on the corner of Broome and Essex streets. It was one of the most popular saloons on the Lower East Side and helped lead to his "election" as Mayor of Broome Street with the League of Locality Mayors. He retired as "Mayor" in 1930, after serving for 35 years. Later in life he worked at a bank on the East Side.

Rosenstein was married to Anna. Their children were Mrs. Lillian Elson, Mrs. Belle Kushner, Ben, Arthur, Melville, and Robert. He was Jewish.

Rosenstein died at home from a heart attack after attending Thanksgiving dinner at his son-in-law's home on November 26, 1931. He was buried in Mount Carmel Cemetery.

References

External links 
 The Political Graveyard
 Edward Rosenstein at Find a Grave

1864 births
1931 deaths
People from the Lower East Side
Politicians from Manhattan
Jewish American state legislators in New York (state)
20th-century American politicians
Democratic Party members of the New York State Assembly
Burials in New York (state)